The Indian Military Training Team (IMTRAT), established since 1961–62, is a training mission of the Indian Army in Bhutan. IMTRAT is responsible for the training of the personnel of the Royal Bhutan Army (RBA) and the Royal Bodyguard of Bhutan (RBG). It is the oldest training team sent outside India to a friendly foreign nation. IMTRAT is headquartered at Haa Dzong in Western Bhutan.

History
In May 1961, Government of India sent a team of military officers and men on a reconnaissance mission to Bhutan. The team was led by BGS XXXIII Corps Brigadier J. S. Aurora (who later became Lieutenant General and Eastern Army Commander during the Indo-Pakistani War of 1971).

On 20 July 1962, Colonel B. N. Upadhyay of the 9th Gorkha Rifles took over as First Commandant of IMTRAT. His initial team had about 15 officers.

The Wangchuk Lo Dzong Military School (WLDMS) was raised on 16 October 1962 and commenced training with 22 officer cadets and 49 non-commissioned officers.

Commandant
The office of the commandant was held by an officer of the rank of colonel, but was later upgraded to brigadier. Currently, the commandant is a two-star appointment.

Bhutan does not have a Minister of Defence, so the Commandant of IMTRAT acts as an informal advisor to the King of Bhutan, who is the Supreme Commander-in-Chief of the RBA.

Establishments
Apart from the WLDMS, IMTRAT runs the Indo-Bhutan Friendship Hospital (IBFH). It was established in 1970 and was inaugurated by the then-Commandant Major General T. V. Jeganathan, . IMTRAT also runs a mobile clinic at Haa.
The Indian Army also maintains a detachment in the capital city of Thimphu.

See also
 Royal Bhutan Army
 Bhutan–India relations
 Overseas Military bases of India

References

Bhutan–India relations
Army units and formations of India
Indian Overseas Military bases
Military of Bhutan
Military units and formations established in 1962